SB-612,111 is an opioid receptor ligand which is a potent and selective antagonist for the nociceptin receptor (ORL-1), several times more potent than the older drug J-113,397. It does not have analgesic effects in its own right, but prevents the development of hyperalgesia, and also shows antidepressant effects in animal studies.

See also 
 JTC-801
 J-113,397
 LY-2940094

References 

4-Phenylpiperidines
Opioids
Chloroarenes
Secondary alcohols
Nociceptin receptor antagonists